William Douglas Lionel Graham (November 15, 1935 – January 2, 2020) was a Canadian football player who played for the Hamilton Tiger-Cats. He won the Grey Cup with them in 1953 and 1957. Graham previously played football with the Kitchener-Waterloo Dutchmen, and was educated at St. Andre's College. He was chairman of the Sources of Knowledge Forum of the Bruce Peninsula. Previously he was a manager, president, and eventually majority owner of University Scholarships of Canada. He lived on the Bruce Peninsula and in Mississauga, Ontario.  Graham died on January 2, 2020.

References

1935 births
2020 deaths
Hamilton Tiger-Cats players
Sportspeople from Hamilton, Ontario
Players of Canadian football from Ontario